Petar Krachmarov (born 31 January 1938) is a Bulgarian volleyball player. He competed at the 1964 Summer Olympics and the 1968 Summer Olympics.

References

1938 births
Living people
Bulgarian men's volleyball players
Olympic volleyball players of Bulgaria
Volleyball players at the 1964 Summer Olympics
Volleyball players at the 1968 Summer Olympics
Sportspeople from Sofia